Linoleum is a 2022 American science fiction comedy-drama film written and directed by Colin West and starring Jim Gaffigan. It premiered at the 2022 South by Southwest festival on March 12, 2022. It was released in select theaters in the United States on February 24, 2023, by Shout! Studios.

Plot
Cameron Edwin lives a rather boring life in a small Ohio town with his wife Erin and daughter Nora. He hosts a children's science television show in a small market that runs at midnight. Cameron had always wanted to be an astronaut and grew up in the shadow of his more successful scientist father. When part of a rocket falls from orbit and crashes into his backyard, he decides to fulfill his unrealized dream and rebuild it into his own rocket. His wife, who has started divorce proceedings, thinks he is having a midlife crisis. As some other surreal events occur in his life, he not only feels his mission is justified but he begins to question the nature of reality.

Cast
 Jim Gaffigan as Cameron Edwin/Kent Armstrong
 Rhea Seehorn as Erin Edwin
 Katelyn Nacon as Nora Edwin
 Gabriel Rush as Marc
 Tony Shalhoub as Dr. Alvin
 Michael Ian Black as Tony
 Amy Hargreaves as Linda
 Jay Walker as Mr. Fuller
 West Duchovny as Darcy
 Roger Hendricks Simon as Mac

Production
Filming wrapped in New York City in November 2020.

Reception
On the review aggregator website Rotten Tomatoes, the film holds an approval rating of 82% based on 42 reviews, with an average rating of 7.2/10. The critical consensus reads, "A solid showcase for Jim Gaffigan as well as a sneakily ambitious dramedy, Linoleum adds another impressive entry to writer-director Colin West's filmography."

Alan Ng of Film Threat rated the film an 8.5 out of 10, calling it "a heartfelt and touching movie about finding joy and fulfillment in life."

Ross Bonaime of Collider graded the film an A− and wrote, "With this film about people trying to find what makes them extraordinary, West has made an extraordinary tale of the personal universes we all inhabit, the strange messiness of life, and the beauty of how everything all shakes out in the end."

Trace Sauveur of The Austin Chronicle gave the film a positive review and wrote, "...a surprising and poignant reflection on what it means to live a fulfilling life, the memories and evocations of which will swell within you long after they've passed."

Brian Tallerico of RogerEbert.com gave the film a negative review, calling it "a film with so many good ideas, especially in its final ten minutes, but without the clear vision to coalesce them into something that works from beginning to end."

Mae Abdulbaki of Screen Rant awarded the film three stars out of five and wrote, "While the film doesn't always soar to its potential, it offers a fascinating, resplendent look at regret and the untapped potential of their youth."

Angie Han of The Hollywood Reporter gave the film a positive review and wrote, "But thoughtful performances and earnest (if especially subtle) writing keep the film compelling enough until its final minutes, which are even more startling in their heart-wrenching effectiveness than in their mind-bending twists."

Pete Hammond of Deadline Hollywood gave the film a positive review and wrote, "For me Linoleum is a pleasant enough, if somewhat less than memorable ride that doesn't really take flight like you might hope it would. For Gaffigan fans though that should be enough."

Robert Daniels of IndieWire graded the film a B and wrote, "Linoleum is an otherworldly tragedy about endings and beginnings, and the existential rot whose origins feel unknown."

Matt Donato of IGN gave the film a positive review and wrote, "Director Colin West plucks heartstrings that inspire our zest for lives lived to the fullest, delivered through both peaceful and aggressive means."

Ethan Anderton of Slash Film gave the film a positive review and wrote, "Jim Gaffigan has easily delivered a career-best performance in Linoleum."

References

External links
 
 

2022 comedy-drama films
2022 independent films
2022 science fiction films
2020s American films
2020s English-language films
2020s science fiction comedy-drama films
American independent films
American science fiction comedy-drama films
Films shot in New York City